The list of Odonata species of Slovenia includes 72 species of dragonflies and damselflies for which reliable records exist from the present-day territory of Slovenia, including one that has not been seen since the 1960s and is presumed to have been extirpated (locally extinct), but could have simply been overlooked. The list is based on two reference works: Atlas of the Dragonflies (Odonata) of Slovenia, a joint publication of the Slovene Odonatological Society and the Slovene Centre for Cartography of Fauna and Flora from 1997, and the newer Atlas of the European dragonflies and damselflies (2015), supported by other, more recent publications in which new species described after 1997 were documented.

Odonata species from the territory of present-day Slovenia were systematically studied by the naturalists Johann Weikhard von Valvasor and Giovanni Antonio Scopoli as early as the 17th and 18th centuries; however, the first systematic compendium was only published in the 1960s by the Slovene zoologist . The distribution of Odonata in Slovenia is now fairly well known by international standards, with Slovenia having been one of the first European countries for which a full account of faunistic data (an "atlas") was published. The number of species (72) represents almost exactly half of the European species (143) and is comparable with the number of species of Germany (81) and Spain (80), both much larger countries. Slovenian odonate fauna is therefore considered highly diverse, which is attributed to the country's position on the junction of several ecoregions where many species reach the border of their distribution.

The list 
Taxonomic order and nomenclature follow the Atlas of the European dragonflies and damselflies (2015), while Atlas of the Dragonflies (Odonata) of Slovenia is the primary source of the data, with notes explaining discrepancies.

Columns with scientific and vernacular names in English and Slovene are followed by conservation status as determined by the country's official Red list of Odonata (Rdeči seznam kačjih pastirjev). Categories of conservation status according to this list are as follows:
 extinct species (EX): once reliably recorded native populations that have been exterminated in the past throughout the whole territory of the Republic of Slovenia.
 presumed extinct species (EX?): once reliably recorded native populations which haven't been seen for a longer period despite targeted searching, providing grounds for the presumption of local extinction.
 endangered species (E): the existence of this species on the territory of Slovenia is not likely in the future if the reasons for endangerment are not removed. Population size is critically low or is rapidly diminishing in a large part of the areal.
 vulnerable species (V): risk of becoming endangered (E) if the negative influences persist. Population size is being reduced in a large part of the areal, whereas the species is sensitive to changes in the environment or inhabits sensitive habitats.
 rare species (R): potentially vulnerable due to its rarity in Slovenia, may rapidly become endangered (E) in case of negative influences.
 non-defined (I): presumed endangered, but there is insufficient data to assign to any of the above categories.
Most (24) of the species included in the Red List are also protected according to the newer Ordinance on protected native species of animals (Uredba o zavarovanih prosto živečih živalskih vrstah) from 2004, which annulled the previous ordinance on which the Red list is based. The protected species are labelled with an additional asterisk (*), while the old Red list statuses are retained for reference.

Most species native to Slovenia are not globally threatened and are regarded least-concern by the International Union for Conservation of Nature (IUCN). There are two exceptions – both Cordulegaster species – that are near-threatened. Additionally, the southern damselfly (Coenagrion mercuriale) is near-threatened as well, but that species is almost certainly extirpated.

Damselflies (Zygoptera)

Dragonflies (Anisoptera)

Excluded species 
The Slovene Atlas mentions four additional species as records from older literature, but there is insufficient evidence for their presence so they are excluded from that list as well:
 Irish damselfly (Coenagrion lunulatum) – one recorded sighting in the 1950s, but Slovenia lies far outside the species' distribution range so it was most likely misidentified
 large pincertail (Onychogomphus uncatus) – one sighting with a photograph, but the specimen cannot be reliably distinguished from the similar Onychogomphus forcipatus in the picture
 golden-ringed dragonfly (Cordulegaster boltonii) – records from the 1950s belong to Cordulegaster heros which was formally split from C. boltonii in 1979
 northern white-faced darter (Leucorrhinia rubicunda) – one doubtful sighting

References

External links 

 Slovene Dragonfly Society (in Slovenian)
 Odonata - pictures in the BioPortal database, maintained by the Centre for Cartography of Fauna and Flora

Odonata
Odonata
Slovenia
Slovenia